Maksudur Rahman Mostak is a Bangladeshi professional footballer who currently plays as a  goalkeeper for Mohammedan SC in Bangladesh League.

References

Living people
Bangladeshi footballers
Sheikh Jamal Dhanmondi Club players
Association football goalkeepers
Bangladesh international footballers
1990 births
Bangladesh Football Premier League players
Muktijoddha Sangsad KC players
Bashundhara Kings players
Mohammedan SC (Dhaka) players